Downtown Fulton Historic District is a national historic district located at Fulton, Callaway County, Missouri.  It encompasses 57 contributing buildings and 1 contributing structure in the central business district of Fulton.  It developed between about 1877 and 1954, and includes representative examples of Italianate, Second Empire, Colonial Revival, and Classical Revival style architecture.  Some of the buildings were designed by noted local architect Morris Frederick Bell.  Notable buildings include the Southern Bank of Fulton (c. 1905), Masonic Lodge (1872), Home Savings Bank (c. 1884), Montgomery-Bell Dry Goods (c. 1902), Humphreys-Atkinson-Reid Furniture Company (c. 1888), Fulton Cinema (1926), Kingdom Oil Company (1937), First Christian Church (1911), Adams Building (1890), and U.S. Post Office (1915).

It was listed on the National Register of Historic Places in 2004.

References 

Historic districts on the National Register of Historic Places in Missouri
Second Empire architecture in Missouri
Italianate architecture in Missouri
Colonial Revival architecture in Missouri
Neoclassical architecture in Missouri
Buildings and structures in Callaway County, Missouri
National Register of Historic Places in Callaway County, Missouri